Norberto Téllez Santana (born January 22, 1972 in Rodas, Cienfuegos) is a retired Cuban runner.

Career

Originally a 400 metres runner who also enjoyed success in 4 x 400 metres relay, winning the silver medal at the 1992 Olympics, Téllez later converted to the 800 metres distance. At the 1996 Summer Olympics he ran in 1:42.85 and thereby improved the national record of Alberto Juantorena. However, this wasn't enough to secure a medal as he finished in fourth place. A silver medal from the 1997 World Championships was his best result thereafter.

Major achievements

1Representing the Americas
2Did not finish in the semifinals

Personal bests
 200 metres – 21.10 (1994)
 400 metres – 45.27 (1994)
 800 metres – 1:42.85 (1996)

External links
 
 Picture of Norberto Téllez (right)

References

1972 births
Cuban male sprinters
Cuban male middle-distance runners
Olympic athletes of Cuba
Olympic silver medalists for Cuba
Living people
Athletes (track and field) at the 1996 Summer Olympics
Athletes (track and field) at the 1992 Summer Olympics
Athletes (track and field) at the 1995 Pan American Games
Athletes (track and field) at the 1999 Pan American Games
World Athletics Championships medalists
Medalists at the 1992 Summer Olympics
Pan American Games gold medalists for Cuba
Olympic silver medalists in athletics (track and field)
Pan American Games medalists in athletics (track and field)
Universiade medalists in athletics (track and field)
Goodwill Games medalists in athletics
Central American and Caribbean Games gold medalists for Cuba
Competitors at the 1993 Central American and Caribbean Games
Competitors at the 1998 Central American and Caribbean Games
Universiade gold medalists for Cuba
Central American and Caribbean Games medalists in athletics
Medalists at the 1997 Summer Universiade
Medalists at the 1999 Summer Universiade
Competitors at the 1998 Goodwill Games
Competitors at the 1994 Goodwill Games
Medalists at the 1995 Pan American Games
Medalists at the 1999 Pan American Games
People from Cienfuegos Province
20th-century Cuban people